The Play-offs to the 1. divisjon for women in association football is a Norwegian play-off competition that have taken place from 2001.

The play-offs were instituted because of the streamlining of the 1. divisjon (second tier) ahead of the 2001 season, into one national league. Before that, the 1. divisjon consisted of several groups, whose teams themselves engaged in a playoff to the Toppserien, the first tier.

The playoffs have never had a clear-cut institutionalized shape or form.

2011

Pool 1

Pool 2

2010

Pool 1

Pool 2

2008
First, there was a pre-playoff between the Northern Norwegian teams:

Alta – won
Bossmo & Ytteren
Sortland

Then, eight teams, of which two from the 1. divisjon, faced another team in two legs.

Gjøvik beat Eik-Tønsberg on the away goals rule; 3–3 on aggregate (and Gjøvik stayed in the 1. divisjon)
Linderud-Grei beat Vålerenga 7–5 on aggregate (and L-G stayed in the 1. divisjon)
Orkla beat Sola 3–1 on aggregate
Alta beat Borgen 4–1 on aggregate

Reference: Norwegian Women's Football

2007
First, there was a pre-playoff between the Northern Norwegian teams:

Alta – won
Sortland
Halsøy

Then the actual playoff consisted of two groups.

Gjøvik – promoted
Alta
Orkla

Voss – promoted
Fossum
Vålerenga

Reference: Norwegian Women's Football

2006
First, there was a pre-playoff between the Northern Norwegian teams:

Tromsdalen – won
Innstranden
Leknes

Then the actual playoff consisted of two groups.

Tromsdalen – promoted
Skjetten – promoted
Ranheim

Donn – promoted
Linderud-Grei – promoted (after yet another one-on-one playoff against Sola)
Sola

Reference: Norwegian Women's Football

2005
First, there was a pre-playoff between the Northern Norwegian teams:

Tromsdalen – won
Bossmo & Ytteren
Alta
Mjølner

Then the actual playoff consisted of two groups.

Manglerud Star – promoted
Orkla
Tromsdalen

Haugar – promoted
Skjetten
Donn

Reference: Norwegian Women's Football

2004
First, there was several pre-playoffs:

Kaupanger beat Hana 18–0 on aggregate
Grand Bodø beat both Leknes and Leknes
Træff beat Orkla

Then the actual playoff consisted of two groups.

Grand Bodø – promoted
Linderud-Grei
Træff

Kaupanger – promoted
Skjetten
Donn

Reference: Norwegian Women's Football

2003
First, there were two pre-playoffs:

Ranheim beat Eid 11–0 in one match
Grand Bodø beat both Leknes and Tromsdalen

Then the actual playoff consisted of two groups.

Fart – promoted
Ranheim
Grand Bodø

Bamble – promoted
Nymark
Vallset

Reference: Norwegian Women's Football

2002
First, there were two pre-playoffs:

Kattem beat Træff 7–1 in one match
Innstranden beat both Leknes and Tromsdalen

Then the actual playoff consisted of two groups.

Kattem – promoted
Vallset
Innstranden

Amazon Grimstad – promoted
Kaupanger
Storhamar

Reference: Norwegian Women's Football

2001
First, there were two pre-playoffs:

Herd beat Orkla 1–0 in one match
Innstranden beat both Håkvik and Alta

Then the actual playoff consisted of two groups.

Skeid – promoted
Innstranden
Herd

Gjelleråsen – promoted
Nymark
Fossum

Reference: Norwegian Women's Football

References

Norwegian First Division (women)
Norwegian Second Division (women)
2001 establishments in Norway